The State of Florida, the United States Federal government, local governments, and indigenous tribal governments have particular interests in the protection and preservation of Native American cultural, historic, and sacred sites in Florida. Florida has faced threats to its indigenous sites from looting, a lack of protection, citizen or amateur archaeologists, development, and other factors. Only in recent years has the protection of indigenous sites become a focus in Florida, where a long history of site destruction and looting is now being challenged.

Law enforcement agencies mainly the Florida Fish and Wildlife Conservation Commission, have made efforts to protect Native American sites and disrupt the illegal artifact trade. Additionally anthropological and archaeological societies as well as Native American groups have been public forces fighting to protect indigenous sites. Despite the progress and increasing awareness in Native American site protection, recent bills in both the Senate and the House of Representatives have threatened sites throughout the state. These bills have also brought increased attention to the controversial issue of the protection of Native American sites.

Threats from looting/treasure hunting 
The archaeological sites of Florida's indigenous peoples have been disturbed and looted since the arrival of Europeans, however, recent changes have increased the scope and destructiveness of the problem. In the late 1970s looting of sites on state owned lands increased dramatically and spread across the state from the Tampa Bay area north towards the St. Marks River. Entering the 1980s, looting was still on the rise and the market value of illegal artifacts was as well. In 1994 the isolated finds program was introduced, which greatly muddied the line between legal collecting and the illegal artifact trade making an already difficult job of site protection for law enforcement nearly impossible. Looters are generally looking for pottery, stone tools, and human remains, which they can then sell on the black market around the world for significant profits. Some looters are not interested in the illegal artifact trade but are just curious about the past and enjoy finding and collecting artifacts. These looters are no less harmless than those in the trade as they still destroy the cultural and historical context of artifacts making the sites nearly useless. Glen Doran, a Florida State University archaeologist says that a Native American pot that would sell in Florida for $300 can sell in places like Tokyo, Berlin, or London for $10,000 to $50,000.

Looters have used a variety of methods to excavate artifacts, ranging from amateur archeology tools to bare hands to bulldozers. In 1978, looters near Charlotte Harbor drove a bulldozer across state lands, down an Indian ridge, through the mangroves and out to Big Mound Key. Once on the 13.5-acre site, the looters opened up a 15-foot trench through the mound, apparently in the hope of finding the hidden treasure cache of the mythical pirate Jose Gaspar, a fictional figure from Florida folklore. The resulting gash in the mound is still visible decades later, and news coverage of the damage caused by "looters in search of a non-pirate's non-treasure" helped spur the passage of state laws to protect such sites.

Looting remains a major concern among archaeologists, as it is difficult and expensive for the state to reliably protect sites. Looting concerns are the main reason for the strong opposition of archaeologists and anthropological organizations to the proposed bills related to isolated finds or the Citizen Archaeology Permit.

Law enforcement efforts 
Efforts to enforce current laws relating to the protection of indigenous sites have been difficult and largely unsuccessful. There are too many archaeological sites in Florida for law enforcement agencies to be able to monitor them and catch looters while they are digging. According to the Florida Fish and Wildlife Conservation Commission (FWC), most looters are very woods savvy and they have often grown up hunting and fishing in the same areas where they steal artifacts. FWC ended a two-year investigation in 2014 named Operation Timucua, led by Maj. Curtis Brown. Operation Timucua was an intense undercover operation aimed at disrupting the illegal artifact trade in Florida. FWC agents understand that catching looters in the act is very difficult so they focussed on stopping the trade of artifacts thus destroying the incentives of looters. The operation resulted in the seizure of two million dollars worth of artifacts and 14 arrests. While the operation was successful, public outcry and lenient court systems ultimately resulted in fairly insignificant sentences. In reference to and defense of Operation Timucua, Rob Bendus, the Florida Department of State Spokesman said, "This looting incident didn't just take artifacts out of the ground. It took history away from this generation and future generations of Florida".

Native American stance on site protection 
Florida has lost the Native American peoples whose sites are most threatened in modern times, however, remaining native groups, mainly the Seminole Tribe of Florida have taken a stance on site protection. In the February 2016 issue of the Seminole Tribune, the Citizen Archaeology Permit as proposed by House bill 803 and Senate Bill 1054 was openly opposed. The article quoted Willie Johns, Chief Justice of the Seminole Tribal Court in reference to House Bill 803 saying, “We don’t go out digging in other peoples’ cemeteries. Now, for $100 you get a free pass to dig up my grandparents.” The article focussed on the possibility of losing cultural heritage and the reversal of the progress that has been made in the protection of indigenous sacred sites.

Isolated Finds Program 
The Isolated Finds Program, sometimes referred to as the Isolated Finds Policy, was implemented by Florida's Department of Historic Resources in 1994 and ended in June 2005. The Isolated Finds Program was intended to establish a way for private citizens to legally collect archaeological artifacts and report them to the state. In order to be legally collected the artifacts had to be on submerged state lands such as river bottoms and displaced from their original context. Isolated artifacts on submerged lands are often thought to be removed from their context and original place of deposition which would mean that they have lost much of their historical and cultural significance. Unfortunately amateur, citizen archaeologists are not qualified to determine whether or not an artifact is in its original context, which often led to the destruction of archaeological sites under the protection of the Isolated Finds Program. Florida is also unique in that its rivers do not flow like the rivers of other states with isolated finds programs. Rivers in Florida are generally very slow flowing and are composed of fill sediments that hold artifacts very well, making isolated artifacts less likely to occur. The Isolated finds program was discontinued on June 1, 2005, following a recommendation from the Florida Historical Commission. The program was widely considered a failure as issues of non-compliance from citizens basically defeated the program's purpose and instead provided a legal front for the looting of archaeological sites and the illegal artifact trade. Additionally, citizens often reported isolated finds that were later referenced and discovered to be from known archaeological sites, further highlighting the difficulty of determining whether or not a find is isolated. Some do argue that the program had some success, citing the first 8 years of the program in which there were 660 reports from a total of 86 individuals of 4,939 prehistoric and 103 historic artifacts. While these numbers show that some finds were reported there is no way to determine how many finds went unreported or were not actually isolated.  Following the discontinuation of the Isolated Finds Programs, groups have lobbied for a bill every year that would bring back the program, at least to some degree, with the Citizen Archaeology Permit bills of 2016 being the most notable.

Citizen Archaeology Permit (CAP) 
The Citizen Archaeology Permit or CAP was proposed by the 2016 House Bill 803 and 2016 Senate Bill 1054. The CAP program was basically a reincarnation of Florida's failed Isolated Finds Program of 1994–2005. The bills direct Florida's Department of Historical Resources to implement a program that would allow for the legal recovery of Native American artifacts by private citizens. Citizens with the $100 permit would be allowed to remove artifacts from submerged lands owned by the state (mostly rivers) as long as they were not in their original context.  Permit holders would be allowed to use only trowels to recover artifacts and would be required to document the location and the artifact through photographs and other means then submit the information to the state. The idea behind the bills is that citizens would only remove artifacts in rivers that were already dislodged from their original contexts through the process of erosion, thus not destroying any archaeological evidence. Citizens already remove the artifacts illegally so the program would allow for them to register their finds with the state, giving archaeologists access to otherwise private collections.

There has been widespread criticism of and opposition to the proposed Citizen Archaeology Permit by archaeological and historical communities in Florida. Theresa Schober, president of the Florida Anthropological Society opposed the program stating that it was not proposed to help casual collectors as it would seem from the wording, but rather it was proposed to help those who are in the currently illegal artifact trade. Schober also points out that the organizations that are lobbying for the bill, while they may seem similar to chapters of the Florida Anthropological Society (FAS), do not meet the ethical requirements of the FAS. Schober argues that the CAP program will reverse the legislative progress that has been made in protecting Florida's cultural heritage and will exploit non-renewable historical and archaeological resources.

In January 2016, J.W. Joseph the president of the Society for Historical Archaeology also wrote a letter in opposition to House Bill 803. The Society for Historical Archaeology letter voiced similar concerns to those of other groups, however, J.W. Joseph also brought up that the CAP program would likely endanger historical and cultural sites outside of submerged state lands. Citizens with a CAP would be inclined to excavate in stream banks and other areas near waterways according to the letter. J.W. Joseph also appeals to the state by bringing up that CAP holders would create navigational hazards in waterways and that the state would incur great costs to run the program with little return from the sale of permits.

In March 2016, the Florida Association of Museums (FAM) released a statement in opposition to House Bill 803. Much of the statement focussed on concerns that the CAP program would endanger Florida's cultural heritage and historic record. The statement stressed that this program will cause the loss of irreplaceable archaeological sites that need to be studied by experts rather than destroyed by hobbyists. Additionally, the artifacts recovered by private citizens will end up in private collections where the cultural heritage cannot be shared, rather than being turned over to places like the Seminole Tribe of Florida's Tribal Historic Research Office (THPO). The FAM statement also brings up a point that many other organizations opposed to the bill have not vocalized, which is the section of the bill that requires the Division of Historical Resources to provide Citizen Archaeology Permit holders with a map of archaeological sites that cannot be excavated. The disclosure of this information directly contradicts current law that exempts archaeological sites from public records in order to preserve their cultural and historical value from looting and other destructive behaviors.

Problems of site protection in Florida 
Florida has a unique history, culture, and climate that makes the protection of Native American sites especially difficult. Despite Florida's long history of indigenous and European occupation, the first professional archaeology in south Florida was not conducted until 1869 by Jeffries Wyman of Harvard's Peabody Museum. Additionally, there was no comprehensive law that protected cultural and natural resources until the Antiquities Act of 1906. Prior to 1906, Florida residents had free rein to loot and destroy cultural and historical sites including shell mounds and ancient burials. There have also been the longstanding issues of the lack of funding and enforcement related to indigenous site protection. Many local governments do not have the resources to enforce existing laws and local governments are also inconsistent in their enforcement of the laws. Florida has a long and continuing history of rapid development, which is often in conflict with the protection and preservation of archaeological sites. In the past 60 years, Florida's population has risen from 4.5 million to 18.8 million, which increases the strain on cultural and historic resources. Advances in technology such as Scuba equipment that became widely available in 1968 have also increased the strain on submerged archaeological sites and the difficulty of protecting them. One major issue facing the those who seek to preserve sites in modern times, is the lack of public interest in the subject. Many residents do not understand the cultural and historic significance of local indigenous sites because there is little visible surface evidence of occupation.

Threats from invasive species 
The invasive feral hog was introduced to Florida first in 1539 by the Spanish explorer Hernando de Soto. Aside from harboring diseases, killing native plant and animal species, and destroying crops, feral hogs are also a significant threat to indigenous sites in Florida. Feral hogs often root as deep as 20 centimeters in the soft Florida soil with some examples of rooting up to 45 centimeters in Florida. A study on feral hog rooting that involved 293 archaeological sites in Florida found that 90% of the sites had artifacts within the first 20 centimeters of the soil and 85% of sites had artifacts within the first 10 centimeters of the soil, making these sites especially vulnerable to feral hog disturbance. The study gave a conservative estimate that 42% of the sites experienced feral hog disturbance during the time period of study. The study also found that after 18 months the damage from feral hogs was impossible to detect, which would lead archaeologists to believe that the sites had not been disturbed.

Laws related to indigenous site protection 
The following is a list of legislation and codes with brief descriptions related to the protection of Native American sites in Florida.

Seminole Tribe of Florida's Cultural Resource Ordinance, 2013 

Seminole Tribe of Florida's Cultural Resource Ordinance or CRO was adopted by the tribal council in 2013 and approved by the Advisory Council on Historic Preservation in 2016. This ordinance allows the tribe to take control of all cultural resources within reservation lands.

The Antiquities Act of 1906 

The Antiquities Act of 1906 was the first federal law that provided protection for cultural and historic resources.

The National Historic Preservation Act of 1966 (NHPA) 

The National Historic Preservation Act of 1966 (NHPA) was intended to establish a program that would further the preservation of additional historic properties throughout the United States.

Section 106 of the National Historic Preservation Act 

Under section 106 of the National Historic Preservation Act, federal agencies are required to consider the consequences of their activities on historic properties and allow the Advisory Council for Historic Preservation to consult on the issue.

Archaeological Resources Protection Act (ARPA) of 1979 

The Archaeological Resources Protection Act of 1979 was intended to protect archaeological and cultural resources on public and Indian lands for future generations. Additionally the ARPA was to improve relations between the government, professional archaeologists, and private citizens.

Native American Graves Protection and Repatriation Act (NAGPRA) of 1990 

The Native American Graves Protection and Repatriation Act (NAGPRA) gives the rights to Native American descendants of the treatment of Native American remains and funerary goods.

Chapter 872.05-- Unmarked Human Burials (Florida Statutes, Title XLVI, Offenses Concerning Dead Bodies and Graves) 

Chapter 872.05 ensures that all human burials be treated with proper respect and dignity regardless of the background of the individual and the location of the site be it on state, submerged, or private lands.

References 

Native American culture
Native American history of Florida